Ida Platt (September 29, 1863 – 1939) was an American lawyer, based in Chicago. In 1894, she became the first African-American woman licensed to practice law in Illinois, and the third in the United States.

Early life
Ida Platt was born in Chicago, Illinois, the daughter of Jacob F. and Amelia B. Platt. Her father owned a lumber business. She worked as a stenographer and secretary to pay her way at law school, and learned German and French in her work. She also studied piano as a young woman.

Platt was the first African-American woman to graduate from Chicago-Kent College of Law when she finished in 1894.

Career
Ida Platt was admitted to the Illinois bar in 1894, becoming the first African-American woman lawyer in that state, and the third in the United States. She worked in the Chicago office of Joseph Washington Errant, practicing probate and real estate law. In 1896 she spoke at the national convention of the Colored Women's League in New York City, on "Woman in the Profession of Law". She opened her own law office downtown in 1911. She was a member of the Cook County Bar Association.

Personal life
Ida Platt's cousin Richard Theodore Greener was the first African-American graduate of Harvard College, dean of Howard University's School of Law, and a diplomat in Siberia; his daughter Belle da Costa Greene was a prominent librarian.

Platt married in 1923, at age 61, and moved to England. She died there in 1939, aged 76 years. Today there is public housing for seniors in Chicago named the Ida Platt Apartments in her memory.

See also
List of first women lawyers and judges in Illinois

References

Further reading
Gwen Hoerr McNamee, "'Without Regard to Race, Sex or Color': Ida Platt, Esquire" Chicago Bar Association Record 13(May 1999): 24.
Gwen Jordan, "Why Breaking Racial Barriers Doesn't Make Us Post-Racial: The Case of Black Women Lawyers in Illinois", Paper presented at the annual meeting of The Law and Society Association, Renaissance Chicago Hotel, Chicago, IL, May 27, 2010.

1863 births
1939 deaths
Lawyers from Chicago
Chicago-Kent College of Law alumni
African-American lawyers
19th-century American women lawyers
19th-century American lawyers
20th-century African-American people
20th-century African-American women